is a Japanese amateur astronomer and a prolific discoverer of hundreds of asteroids since 1993. An orthopaedist by profession, he is also known as an astrophotographer.

The central main-belt asteroid 7300 Yoshisada, discovered by astronomer Takeshi Urata in 1992, was named in his honor. The official  was published on 18 August 1997.

List of discovered minor planets

See also

References 
 

1943 births
Living people
20th-century Japanese astronomers
Discoverers of asteroids